1,2,4-Trihydroxyanthraquinone, commonly called purpurin, is an anthraquinone. It is a naturally occurring red/yellow dye. It is formally derived from 9,10-anthraquinone by replacement of three hydrogen atoms by hydroxyl (OH) groups.

Purpurin is also called verantin, smoke Brown G, hydroxylizaric acid, and C.I. 58205.  It is a minor component of the classical lake pigment "madder lake" or Rose Madder.

History 
Madder root has been used for  dying cloth at least since 1500 BC.  Purpurin and alizarin were isolated from the root by Pierre Robiquet and Colin,  two French chemists, in 1826. They were identified as anthracene  derivatives by Gräbe  and Liebermann in 1868.  They also synthesized  alizarin from bromoanthraquinone, which, together with the  conversion of alizarin into purpurin published previously by M. F. De Lalande,  provided the first synthetic route to purpurin.  The positions of the  OH groups were determined by Bayer and Caro  in 1874–1875.

Natural occurrence
Purpurin occurs in the roots of the madder plant (Rubia tinctorum), together with alizarin (1,2-dihydroxyanthraquinone).  The root actually contains colorless glycosides of the dyes.

Properties
It becomes red when dissolved in ethanol, and yellow when dissolved with alkalis in boiling water. It is insoluble in hexane but soluble in chloroform, and can be obtained from chloroform as reddish needles. Unlike alizarin, purpurin is dissolved by boiling in a solution of aluminum sulfate, from which it can be precipitated by acid. This procedure can be used to separate the two dyes.

Like many dihydroxy- and trihydroxyanthraquinones, pupurin has a purgative action, although only 1/20 as effective as 1,2,7-trihydroxyanthraquinone (anthrapurpurin).

Uses
Purpurin is a fast dye for cotton printing and forms complexes with various metal ions. It fades faster than alizarin on exposure to sunlight.

A study published in Nature journal Scientific Reports suggests that the purpurin could replace cobalt in lithium-ion batteries. Eliminating cobalt would mean eliminating a hazardous material, allow batteries to be produced at room temperature, and lower the cost of recycling batteries. Extracting purpurin from farmed madder is a simple task; alternately, the chemical could be synthesized in a lab.

See also
 Trihydroxyanthraquinone
 Pierre Robiquet, discoverer of purpurin in 1826

References

Anthraquinone dyes
Hydroxyquinols
Trihydroxyanthraquinones